Yvon Bonenfant is a Canadian politician, who was elected to the Legislative Assembly of New Brunswick in the 2010 provincial election. He represented the electoral district of Madawaska-les-Lacs as a member of the Progressive Conservatives until the 2014 provincial election, when he was defeated by Francine Landry in the redistributed riding of Madawaska-les-Lacs-Edmundston.

References

Progressive Conservative Party of New Brunswick MLAs
Living people
21st-century Canadian politicians
Year of birth missing (living people)